Elymus multisetus is a species of wild rye known by the common name big squirreltail.

Description
Elymus multisetus is native to the western United States where it grows in many types of habitat. It is a perennial grass reaching 60 centimeters in maximum height. The inflorescence is an array of spikelets each with several long, hairlike awns which may be up to 20 centimeters long.

External links
Jepson Manual Treatment: Elymus multisetus
Elymus multisetus Photo gallery

multisetus
Flora of the Western United States
Native grasses of California
Flora without expected TNC conservation status